Khurram Shahzad (born 25 September 1993) is a Pakistani cricketer. In March 2019, he was named in Federal Areas' squad for the 2019 Pakistan Cup.

References

External links
 

1993 births
Living people
Pakistani cricketers
Karachi Dolphins cricketers
Karachi Whites cricketers
Cricketers from Karachi